There are several video games based on Takafumi Adachi's manga and anime series Metal Fight Beyblade. The games primarily revolve around the plot of the anime, following Ginga Hagane and his friends. All of the games so far, vary from the main plot and develop original stories and characters, similar to the anime series. The games have been released on home and handheld consoles. The series is mostly based on Sports and fighters with battling tops.

The first game to be released from the Metal Fight Beyblade series was Metal Fight Beyblade DS, which debuted on March 26, 2009, and the latest release being Metal Fight Beyblade: Bakuten! Cyber Pegasis, which was released on December 3, 2009. There are 6 games holding the "Metal Fight Beyblade" name. Most of the games so far have been released only in Japan. Metal Fight Beyblade: Bakutan! Cyber Pegasis for the DS, and "Metal Fight Beyblade: Gachinko Stadium" for the Wii are the first of its game series to be released outside Japan in North America, and Europe. The first DS game will most likely not have an English release due to it being based on the Metal System, (4-piece tops) and the fact that the game was released a week before the anime started in Japan.

Series

Metal Fight Beyblade DS 
The  series is a series of children's, Sports, battling top fighting games developed and published by Hudson.

Single games

References

External links 

Beyblade: Metal Fusion
Beyblade
Beyblade games